The Dortmund-Dorstfeld transmitter was a temporary mediumwave broadcasting facility at the Dorstfeld coal pit in Dortmund, Germany. 

The Dortmund-Dorstfeld transmitter was inaugurated on September 18, 1925.  It was a T-type antenna with two wires, which was spun between two 33-metres-tall wooden guyed masts, placed in a distance of 35 metres. The facility was shut down on December 15, 1927, after the Langenberg transmitter took over.

Literature 
Andreas Brudnjak: Die Geschichte der deutschen Mittelwellen-Sendeanlagen von 1923 bis 1945, Funk-Verlag Hein, Dessau-Roßlau 2010, Page 96/97, 111.

Demolished buildings and structures in Dortmund
1925 establishments in Germany
1927 disestablishments in Germany